Lady Samantha is a British only compilation album by DJM Records of songs recorded by Elton John. Originally released in cassette and 8-track tape formats in 1974, the album featured rarities and B-sides from the earliest days of John's career. It would eventually be issued  on vinyl in 1980 by DJM and finally on CD in 1988. (A remastered CD by PolyGram appeared in 1998.) 

All fourteen songs were included on the 1992 compilation album Rare Masters.

8-Track program listing

Program A
 "Rock and Roll Madonna" – 4:17
 Single A-Side (1970).
 "Whenever You're Ready (We'll Go Steady Again)" – 2:51
 Second of two songs on the B-Side of "Saturday Night's Alright (For Fighting)" (1973).
 "Bad Side of the Moon" – 3:15
 B-Side of "Border Song" (1970).
 "Jack Rabbit" – 1:50
 First of two songs on the B-Side of "Saturday Night's Alright (For Fighting)" (1973).

Program B
 "Into the Old Man's Shoes" – 4:04
 U.K. B-Side of "Your Song" (1970).
 "It's Me That You Need" – 4:04
 Single A-Side (1969).
 "Ho! Ho! Ho! (Who'd Be a Turkey at Christmas)" – 4:02
 B-Side of "Step Into Christmas" (1973).

Program C
 "Skyline Pigeon" – 3:53
 Live version issued as the B-side of "Daniel" (1973).
 "Screw You (aka Young Man's Blues)" – 4:43
 B-Side of "Goodbye Yellow Brick Road" (1973).
 "Just Like Strange Rain" – 3:43
 B-Side of "It's Me That You Need" (1969).

Program D
 "Grey Seal" – 3:36
 Original version released as The B-Side of "Rock And Roll Madonna" (1970).
 "Honey Roll" – 3:00
 B-Side of "Friends" from the "Friends" soundtrack (1971).
 "Lady Samantha" – 3:02
 Single A-Side (1973).
 "Friends" – 2:20
 Single A-Side from the "Friends" soundtrack (1971).

External links
Album on Amazon

1974 compilation albums
1980 compilation albums
Albums produced by Gus Dudgeon
Elton John compilation albums
Albums recorded at Trident Studios